A List of feature films distributed in Germany in 1950. This was the first full year of film production since the formal partition of Germany into East and West in 1949.

A–Z

Bibliography 
 Davidson, John & Hake, Sabine. Framing the Fifties: Cinema in a Divided Germany. Berghahn Books, 2007.

See also
 List of Austrian films of 1950
 List of East German films of 1950

External links 
IMDB listing for West German films made in 1950
filmportal.de listing for films made in 1950

West German
Lists of German films
film